The 3,000 mile myth refers to a common belief, particularly in the United States, that all motor vehicles should have their motor oil changed at least every  to maintain their car engine. Efforts are under way to convince the public that this is not necessary and that people should follow the advice given in their owner's manual rather than the advice of oil-change businesses. With modern synthetic oils and new tests such as BMW's LL ("long life") oil specifications, most current cars can go over  before needing an oil change. Even most modern conventional oils (also called mineral oils) can take a car engine at least  before needing an oil change.

References

Motor vehicle maintenance
Consumer protection
Engines
Misconceptions
Motor oils